Assoro is a comune in   the Province of Enna, Sicily, southern Italy. The town-site of Assoro occupies the site of ancient Assorus.

The fight to take the heights of Assoro during WWII figured prominently in Farley Mowat’s account of his wartime service, And No Birds Sang.

Among the main sights in the town is the 12th-century Basilica di San Leone.

References

Municipalities of the Province of Enna